Charles Eugene, 2nd Duke of Arenberg (1633–1681), a Knight of the Order of the Golden Fleece since 1678,  became 2nd Duke of Arenberg in 1674 on the death of his half-brother Philippe François, 1st Duke of Arenberg. The original  title had been  awarded on 6 June 1644, by  Habsburg Emperor Ferdinand III, Holy Roman Emperor, making  the principality of Arenberg a dukedom of the Austrian Empire..

He married Marie-Henriette de Cusance, marquise de Varambon in 1660. Their two sons Philippe Charles François, 3rd Duke of Arenberg  and Alexandre, fell in battle in 1691 and 1683 respectively. He was Grand-Bailli and Capitaine-Général of Hainaut.

See also
 List of Knights of the Golden Fleece

Further reading

http://www.arenbergfoundation.eu The Arenberg archives, a family with very strong Flemish roots, quite important in Imperial Spain and later in the Holy Roman Empire, are located for the most part in Arras, Brussels, Cambrai, Coblenz, Douai, Düsseldorf, Enghien, Louvain, Osnabrück, Paris, Salzburg and Vienna.

House of Ligne
Arenberg family
Dukes of Arenberg
Dukes of Aarschot
Knights of the Golden Fleece
1633 births
1681 deaths